The Back from the Edge Tour is the third headlining tour by British singer and songwriter James Arthur in support of his second studio album Back from the Edge. It consists of 16 concerts, 11 arena shows and 9 worldwide concerts and is his first tour since signing to Columbia Records in Germany and re-signing to Syco Music.

The tour was announced via his Twitter account on 1 November 2016. On 13 March 2017, it was announced that that evening's scheduled concert at the O2 Academy in Sheffield was postponed due to James being ordered to go on vocal rest by doctors.  The rescheduled concert will be on 29 May 2017.  On 3 April 2017, further UK dates as well as dates in Belfast and Dublin were announced on Twitter with the concerts set to be held in November.

Set list

Leg 1
"Back from the Edge"
"Prisoner"
"You're Nobody 'til Somebody Loves You"
"Sermon"
"Train Wreck"
"Impossible"
"Sober"
"I Am"
"Get Down"
"Safe Inside"
"Recovery"
"Skeletons"
"Rockabye" (Clean Bandit cover)
"Phoenix"
"Can I Be Him"
"Say You Won't Let Go"

Leg 2 – Arena Tour
"Back from the Edge"
"I Am"
"Recovery"
"Impossible"
"Sermon"
"Sober"
"Roses"
"Careless Whisper" (George Michael cover)
"Safe Inside"
"You're Nobody 'til Somebody Loves You" (contains excerpt of "Cry Me a River")
"Certain Things"
"Let's Go Home Together" (with Ella Henderson)
"Get Down"
"Can I Be Him"
"Naked"
"Sun Comes Up"
"Say You Won't Let Go"

Tour dates

Rescheduled date

References

2017 concert tours
James Arthur